L'Enchaîné du Nord et du Pas-de-Calais was a Communist Party weekly newspaper published from Lille, France, published on Fridays. Stêphane Dubled was the editor-in-chief of l'Enchaîné.

The first issue of l'Enchaîné was published on 26 May 1923. It replaced a previous Lille-based communist publication, Le Prolétaire. Moreover, the editorial and administrative staff of Le Prolétaire passed on to l'Enchaîné. At the time the Second World War broke out, l'Enchaîné had a circulation of around 100,000.

References

1923 establishments in France
Defunct newspapers published in France
Defunct weekly newspapers
French-language communist newspapers
History of the French Communist Party
Mass media in Lille
Publications with year of disestablishment missing
Publications established in 1923
Weekly newspapers published in France